Svente Parish is an administrative unit of Augšdaugava Municipality in the Selonia region of Latvia. In 2011, the Polish-speaking minority formed the largest ethnic group in the parish, but by 2020 the proportion of ethnic Poles had fallen to 29 percent, slightly below that of ethnic Latvians. Russians form the third largest ethnic group, and, as of 2021, Russian is the most widely spoken language in the parish.

Towns, villages and settlements of Svente Parish

See also 
 Svente Manor

References

 
Parishes of Latvia
Selonia